The 2013–14 Combined Counties Football League season (known as the 2013–14 Cherry Red Records Combined Counties Football League for sponsorship reasons) was the 36th in the history of the Combined Counties Football League, a football competition in England.

Premier Division

The Premier Division featured four new teams after the promotion of Egham Town and Guernsey to Step 4:
Alton Town, transferred from the Wessex League.
Frimley Green, promoted as champions of Division One.
Mole Valley SCR, promoted as third-placed club in Division One.
Westfield, promoted as runners-up in Division One.
The clubs to have applied for promotion to Step 4 were: Camberley Town, Epsom & Ewell, Hanworth Villa, Molesey, South Park, Wembley and Windsor.

League table

Division One

Division One featured two new teams after the resignation of Warlingham: 
Dorking, relegated from the Premier Division.
Sandhurst Town, relegated from the Premier Division.
Broadfields United (Middlesex County League) and Old Farnboronians (Surrey Elite Intermediate League) applied to join the league but were turned down. Fleet Spurs applied to transfer from the Wessex League, but were also turned down.
In 2012, Feltham merged with defunct ex-CCL club Bedfont, forming Bedfont & Feltham. The name change took effect at the end of the 2012–13 season.
Eversley & California were initially promoted as runners-up, but were demoted back to Division One in July 2014 when it emerged that there was a restriction on the use of their floodlights, so the club effectively failed the ground grading requirements. There was no subsequent promotion for fourth-placed Staines Lammas, and no reprieve for relegated Ash United.

League table

References

Notes
 League tables

External links
 Combined Counties League Official Site

2013-14
9